Pylonesque EP was an EP produced and created by Christ. This album had the distinction of being Christ.'s first proper album. Pylonesque EP was released on Benbecula Records.

Track listing
 "A Dream of the Endless" – 5:31
 "Arctica" – 1:43
 "Spengly Bengly" – 4:48
 "Pylonesque" – 3:13
 "Perlandine Friday" – 6:08
 "Fantastic Light" – 5:03
 "Absolom (For Lucy)" – 6:21

References

2002 EPs